The Children's Museum of Oak Ridge (abbreviated as CMOR) is a non-profit children's museum in Oak Ridge, Tennessee, United States, that provides museum exhibits and educational programs.

History
The museum was first conceived as a Girl Scout project. With the support of a $500 grant from Reader's Digest, it opened on March 11, 1973, in the library of the former Jefferson Junior High School. The museum purchased the building and land from the city of Oak Ridge in 1983.

Selma Shapiro was the director of the museum from shortly after its establishment in 1973 until 2004. After her retirement, she continued to serve as a volunteer until shortly before her death in 2011. In the early 1980s Shapiro was the first recipient of the Tennessee Arts Commission's Gordon Holl Arts Administrator Award. In 2005 the American Association of Museums named her to its Centennial Honor Roll, recognizing her as one of 100 American "museum champions" who had worked during the past century to innovate, improve and expand how museums in the United States serve the public.

During the period 1978 to 1982 the Children's Museum conducted a public education project known as "An Appalachian Experience," funded by a $376,000 grant from the National Endowment for the Humanities. The project resulted in the development of teaching materials on Appalachia and the 1982 publication of An Encyclopedia of East Tennessee, edited by James R. Stokely III and Jeff D. Johnson.

Highland View Elementary School
The Highland View Elementary School that houses the museum was one of several elementary schools built in Oak Ridge to serve the children of Manhattan Project employees. It was completed in 1944 at a cost of $181,000. With 25 classrooms, it was intended to house up to 765 students.  In 1993, when the Oak Ridge Historic District was listed on the National Register of Historic Places, the school building was included as a contributing property.

References

External links
Children's Museum of Oak Ridge website

Oak Ridge, Tennessee
Museums established in 1973
Children's museums in Tennessee
Museums in Anderson County, Tennessee
Historic district contributing properties in Tennessee
National Register of Historic Places in Anderson County, Tennessee
School buildings on the National Register of Historic Places in Tennessee
1973 establishments in Tennessee